"Back That Up to the Beat" is a song by American singer Madonna. It was released on digital and streaming platforms on December 30, 2022, and impacted radio in Italy on January 20, 2023. Originally titled "Back That Up (Do It)", the song was recorded for Madonna's 13th studio album Rebel Heart (2015), but did not make it onto the final track listing. The demo version of the song was leaked to the internet on December 23, 2014. A reworked version appeared as a bonus track on the 2-CD deluxe edition of Madonna's fourteenth studio album Madame X (2019).

Background and release
"Back That Up to the Beat" was written by Madonna, Pharrell Williams, and Starrah, while its production was handled by Madonna, Williams, Jeff Bhasker, and Mike Dean. Originally titled "Back That Up (Do It)", the song was first recorded in 2014 and intended for inclusion on Madonna's 13th studio album Rebel Heart (2015). Its demo leaked to the internet on December 23, 2014, and eventually did not made it onto the final track listing of the album. The song was later reworked in 2019 and appeared as a bonus track on the 2-CD deluxe edition of Madonna's 14th studio album Madame X. The Madame X version features a radically different composition, filled with Arabic musical instruments and complex drums.

In September 2022, the original demo version went viral on social media app TikTok, and appeared among the most-searched songs on Shazam globally. The song was also illegally released to Spotify, along with the slowed down and accelerated versions. Interscope Records officially released the demo and sped up version of "Back That Up to the Beat" on digital and streaming platforms on December 30, 2022. Madonna announced its release by posting a clip of the sped-up version of the song set to a video of her dancing with kids in Malawi and Kenya, including her four children who joined her visit in Africa as part of her Raising Malawi charity campaign. The official lyric video of the song was uploaded to Madonna's YouTube channel on January 7, 2023, which features an extended version of the original clip with a filtered montage of her Instagram reels, videos and pictures. The song was also released to Italian radio on January 20, 2023.

Reception
In a review for Wonderland magazine, its editor said that the song "sounds as if it was plucked straight out of an Eastern European discotheque circa 2006. It harnesses the same nostalgia that ignited the Y2K trend; its addictive guitar hooks and carnal bassline has us smashing the replay button into oblivion." Jon Bream from Star Tribune picked the song as one of the week's "6 cool things in music", calling it a "cleaner arrangement [w]ith a staccato, snappy beat..." Upon its release to digital outlets, the song entered the top 40 digital charts of Canada, the United Kingdom, and the United States.

Track listing 
Digital single
 "Back That Up to the Beat" (demo version) – 3:31
 "Back That Up to the Beat" (sped up version) – 3:12

Charts

Release history

References

2019 songs
2022 songs
2022 singles
Interscope Records singles
Madonna songs
Songs written by Madonna
Songs written by Pharrell Williams
Songs written by Starrah
Song recordings produced by Madonna